Gradual typing is a type system in which some variables and expressions may be given types and the correctness of the typing is checked at compile time (which is static typing) and some expressions may be left untyped and eventual type errors are reported at runtime (which is dynamic typing). Gradual typing allows software developers to choose either type paradigm as appropriate, from within a single language. In many cases gradual typing is added to an existing dynamic language, creating a derived language allowing but not requiring static typing to be used. In some cases a language uses gradual typing from the start.

History
The term was coined by Jeremy Siek. Jeremy Siek and Walid Taha began researching gradual typing in 2006.

Implementation
In gradual typing, a special type named dynamic is used to represent statically-unknown types. The notion of type equality is replaced by a new relation called consistency that relates the dynamic type to every other type. The consistency relation is reflexive and symmetric but not transitive.

Prior attempts at integrating static and dynamic typing tried to make the dynamic type be both the top and bottom of the subtype hierarchy. However, because subtyping is transitive, that results in every type becoming related to every other type, and so subtyping would no longer rule out any static type errors. The addition of a second phase of plausibility checking to the type system did not completely solve this problem.

Gradual typing can easily be integrated into the type system of an object-oriented language that already uses the subsumption rule to allow implicit upcasts with respect to subtyping. The main idea is that consistency and subtyping are orthogonal ideas that compose nicely. To add subtyping to a gradually-typed language, simply add the subsumption rule and add a subtyping rule that makes the dynamic type a subtype of itself, because subtyping is supposed to be reflexive. (But do not make the top of the subtyping order dynamic!)

Examples
Examples of gradually typed languages derived from existing dynamically typed languages include Closure Compiler, TypeScript (both for JavaScript), Hack (for PHP), PHP (since 7.0), Typed Racket (for Racket), Typed Clojure (for Clojure), Cython (a Python compiler), mypy (a static type checker for Python), pyre (alternative static type checker for Python), or cperl (a typed Perl 5). ActionScript is a gradually typed language that is now an implementation of ECMAScript, though it originally arose separately as a sibling, both influenced by Apple's HyperTalk.

A system for the J programming language has been developed, adding coercion, error propagation and filtering to the normal validation properties of the type system as well as applying type functions outside of function definitions, thereby the increasing flexibility of type definitions.

Conversely, C# started as a statically typed language, but as of version 4.0 is gradually typed, allowing variables to be explicitly marked as dynamic by using the dynamic type.  Gradually typed languages not derived from a dynamically typed language include Dart, Dylan, and Raku.

Raku (formerly Perl6) has gradual typing implemented from the start. Type checks occur at all locations where values are assigned or bound. An "untyped" variable or parameter is typed as Any, which will match (almost) all values. The compiler flags type-checking conflicts at compile time if it can determine at compile time that they will never succeed.

Objective-C has gradual typing for object pointers with respect to method calls. Static typing is used when a variable is typed as pointer to a certain class of object: when a method call is made to the variable, the compiler statically checks that the class is declared to support such a method, or it generates a warning or error. However, if a variable of the type id is used, the compiler will allow any method to be called on it.

The JS++ programming language, released in 2011, is a superset of JavaScript (dynamically typed) with a gradual type system that is sound for ECMAScript and DOM API corner cases.

References

Further reading 
 

Type systems